Brigido is a given name and a surname. Notable people with the name include:
Brígido Iriarte (1921–1984), Venezuelan Olympic track and field athlete
Brígido Lara (born 1939/40), Mexican artist
Bruno Brigido (born 1991), Brazilian footballer
Rúben Brígido (born 1991), Portuguese footballer

See also 

 Brígido Iriarte Stadium, a multi-purpose stadium in Caracas, Venezuela

Portuguese masculine given names
Spanish masculine given names
Portuguese-language surnames
Spanish-language surnames